Sound the Alarm is the third full-length album by American singer-songwriter Howie Day, and the follow-up to his million-selling second album Stop All the World Now. It was recorded over a three-year period, during which he attended a rehabilitation center for alcohol abuse. The album was originally set for release in 2008 before being delayed and eventually released by Epic Records on September 8, 2009. In late 2008, Day uploaded the song "Everyone Loves to Love a Lie" onto his MySpace page. The album was also preceded by a three-song EP, entitled Be There, featuring the album tracks "Be There", "40 Hours" and "Counting on Me". The EP was released to iTunes on May 5, 2009.

Track listing
"So Stung" (Howie Day, Jay Clifford) – 4:37
"Weightless" (Day, Martin Terefe) – 3:57
"Longest Night" (Day, Mike Flynn, Kevin Griffin, Clifford) – 3:35
"40 Hours" (Day, Clifford) – 3:33
"Be There" (Day, Griffin) – 3:51
"Everyone Loves to Love a Lie" (Day, Clifford) – 4:02
"Undressed" (Day, Griffin) – 3:33
"Sound the Alarm" (Day, Clifford) – 3:51
"No Longer What You Require" (Steven Fiore) – 5:59
"Postcard from Mars" (Day, Les Hall) – 4:48
"Counting on Me" (Day, Clifford) – 3:37

iTunes bonus tracks
"Stay This Way" (Album-only track) – 4:12
"Cease Fire" (Pre-order only) – 3:57

Personnel
Jay Clifford – guitar, backing vocals
Howie Day – acoustic guitar, piano, vocals
Les Hall – organ, synthesizer, guitar, piano, harmonium, tamboura, mellotron, vibraphone, wurlitzer

Record charts

References

2009 albums
Howie Day albums
Epic Records albums